Crystal Township may refer to one of the following townships in the United States:

Crystal Township, Hancock County, Iowa
Crystal Township, Tama County, Iowa
Crystal Township, Montcalm County, Michigan
Crystal Township, Oceana County, Michigan

See also 
 

Township name disambiguation pages